Dr. Sally Brinkman is a social epidemiologist with a focus on early childhood development and the impact of society on children's short and long term outcomes.  Sally led the development and implementation of the Early Development Instrument (EDI) for population level data across Australia, now known as the nationwide Australian Early Development Census (AEDC) measuring how children have developed by the time they start their first year of full-time school. Sally works for international organisations including World Bank, UNICEF and AusAID, and has over 100 publications covering child development and education. Sally is an Adjunct Associate Professor at the University of Adelaide and the Co-Director of the Fraser Mustard Centre, an initiative to improve research translation established between the Telethon Kids Institute and the South Australian Department for Education.

Awards 
in 2018 Sally received a National Health and Medical Research Council (NHMRC) Research Excellence Award as Australia's top ranked applicant in the Career Development Fellowships: Population Health – Level 1 category.

References 

Living people
Australian women academics
Academic staff of the University of Adelaide
Australian women epidemiologists
Year of birth missing (living people)